The New York Film Critics Circle Award for Best Non-Fiction Film is the award given for best feature documentary film at the annual New York Film Critics Circle Awards. The category was originally named Best Documentary and was awarded as such between 1980 and 1996. In 1997 it was discontinued and in 1998 it was relaunched under its current name.

List of winning films

Best Documentary (1980–1997)

Best Non-Fiction Film (1998–present)

References

External links
New York Film Critics Circle Awards at the Internet Movie Database

New York Film Critics Circle Awards
American documentary film awards
Awards established in 1980